Imamzadeh Mausoleum or Goy Imam Mosque is located 7 km northward to Ganja. It consists of a complex including walls with entrances, small mosques and funerary monuments. The mausoleum, located inside the mosque, bears the grave of Imamzadeh Ibrahim, son of Imam Muhammad al-Baqir, the fifth Imam of Shi'a Muslims.

History 

The construction of the Imamzadeh Mausoleum in the city of Ganja in Azerbaijan was implemented in the 8th century. According to the inscription found inside of the mausoleum, the sons of Mohammad al-Baqir, who is considered one of the most sacred personalities of Shiite Islam, left their motherland and moved to Azerbaijan and İran in order to escape from the ruling circles of the Umayyad Caliphate (661-750), who carried out the persecution against the representatives of the Prophet of Islam. İmam Ibrahim and Ismail came to the cities of Azerbaijan – Barda and Ganja, but here they were killed by their enemies. Mausoleums were erected on the graves of Imam Ismail in Barda, and Imam Ibrahim in Ganja. The inscription is composed of a small marble plaque on the first floor of the Imamzadeh Tomb.

In the middle ages, restoration and reconstruction work was carried out in the territory of the Imamzadeh Mausoleum. In the 15th and 16th centuries, as a result of the strengthening of the Shiite, special attention was paid to the construction of large structures, the use of religious attributes, as well as new craftsmanship in the repair and restoration of the mausoleum.

Basic information on the restoration of Ganja's ancient monuments, historical buildings, and religious sites dates back to the 18th-19th centuries. This is due to the fact that the restoration work is carried out at the official level, directly by the privileged persons.

During the reign of Javad Khan (1786–1804), major renovations were carried out in the mausoleum and the palace architects Karbalai Sadiq led the work.

Between 1878 and 1879, Nizami Ganjavi mausoleum and Imamzadeh complex were again reconstructed by the chief of the Second Muslim Riders Regiment of the Tsar Russian Army Major-General Israfil bey Yadigarzadeh.

In 2010–2016, major reconstruction and restoration works were carried out in the Imamzadeh complex, as well as on the Ganja-Zazali road laying to the complex. Totally 31 million manats for restoration of Imamzadeh Mausoleum and 17 million manats for road reconstruction have been sent.

10,000 square meters of asphalt cover was laid on the territory of the complex, decorated with ornamental stones, lighting system was installed, infrastructure was created. There are 2 minarets, namazgah (place for prayer) and visitor hall with a height of 42 meters, as well as 2 parking for 500 cars in the area. The first floor of the three-storey main building of the mausoleum is used as a wardrobe. The second floor consists of administrative rooms and the third floor is used as a hotel.

Architectural features 
Imamzadeh was originally a grave in early middle ages. Then the grave gradually turned into a large complex as a result of construction a mausoleum on it. Regarding with the increased importance of the mausoleum as a sanctuary, new craftsmanship and architectural elements were added. The mausoleum is the major monument of the complex. This mausoleum shows how many mausoleums acquired cultic architectural features, losing their features of memorial monuments in the 16th-19th centuries. The mausoleum belongs to tower-cupola types of buildings.

A two-storeyed arch shaped the extension of the mausoleum, surrounding the central kernel from three sides, with a portal from the eastern part. This arch dates from the 17th century. A margin of lancet arches with rectangular frames is a peculiar feature of the extension. The mausoleum is built of square bricks. Inside the mausoleum there is a zarih.

The main parts of the complex are the tomb building and cemetery. Besides, seven domes, mosque, caravanserai houses, the dome on the entrance gate to the monument (ninth dome), ornaments and inscriptions on the gravestones, pool and other auxiliary buildings along with the main tomb dome, shapes the architectural structure of Imamzadeh mausoleum.

A large and tall mosque building with 3 minarets was built over the Imamzadeh tomb. The central dome of the mosque is decorated with floral elements and decorated with symbolic characteristic peacock drawings. The central dome differs significantly from others in terms of its structure and dimensions. Its height is 14.7 meters. From the point of view of architectures, this dome is distinguished by its elegant design features. The central dome, which is called “Imam Ibrahim dome”, is in the shape of ancient helmet (təskulə). The diameter of the dome is 4,4 meters.

The mausoleum was constructed using red bricks and features specific to the Arran Architectural School were used. Small dome cells on the right and left sides of the central dome are later added to the monument in the 13th-16th centuries.

The most prominent part of the Imamzadeh tomb in terms of appearance is the dome and its cylindrical body decorated with colorful blue and green tiles. In the decorating of facades, mainly blue tiles have been used. The baklava-shaped and other figure ornaments are dark purple.  At the same time, it is also possible to find individual greenish tiles. These decorative elements have been added to the monuments in the XIV-XVII centuries. The first floor of the southeastern façade consists of three arches.

Research 
The first researches on Imamzadeh Mausoleum located in Ganja city of Azerbaijan were carried out by L. S. Bretanitski and the author's book "Azerbaijan Architecture" (1952) contains some information about ancient monument in Ganja. However, the investigator considers the Imamzadeh Mausoleum as a XVIII century monument by mistake (without reading the inscriptions in the mausoleum).

For the first time researcher-architect Niyazi Rzayev in his article titled "Ganja Imamzadeh Mausoleum" not only provides architectural and artistic features of the monument, but also gives detailed information about its history. In 1947 N. Rzayev began researches from the scientific point of view of Imamzadeh Mausoleum. After ten years, in 1957 his article was published in the second volume of the collection of the Azerbaijan History Museum.

One of the scientific sources reflecting the history of the Ganja Imamzadeh is the monograph "History of Azerbaijani Architecture" published in 1963 in Russian. In this book, published by M.Huseynov, L.Bretanitski, and A.Salamzadeh, more general information has been given about the Ganja Imamzade.

In A. Salamzade's monograph "Architecture of Azerbaijan (XVI-XIX centuries)", published in Baku in 1964, the architectural features of the monument are thoroughly explored.

Archeologist Isaac Jafarzadeh`s researches, who carried out archeological investigations for many years in ancient Ganja territory and published the results under the name "Ancient Ganja's historical-archeological essay" in 1949 in Baku, is one of the important sources for studying the history of the Imamzadeh mausoleum.

The series of scientific works by Meshadykhanim Nemet in terms of detailed investigation of the history of the Ganja Imamzadeh are also important. Her works "Sacred places in Baku" (Baku, 1992) and "Epigraphic Monuments in Ganja" (Baku, 1991) illustrate the history and some aspects of the Imamzadeh Mausoleum.

References

External links 
 Imamzadeh Mausoleum, Ganja

Tourist attractions in Azerbaijan
Mausoleums in Azerbaijan
Buildings and structures in Ganja, Azerbaijan
Tourist attractions in Ganja, Azerbaijan